Bao Xuding (born February 1939) is a Chinese politician who served as minister of Machinery Industry from 1996 to 1998 and mayor of Chongqing from 1999 to 2002.

He was a member of the 15th Central Committee of the Chinese Communist Party. He was a member of the Standing Committee of the 10th Chinese People's Political Consultative Conference.

Biography
Bao was born in Wuxi, Jiangsu, in February 1939.

He entered the workforce in September 1958, and joined the Chinese Communist Party (CCP) in January 1961. He was deputy director of Sichuan Machinery Industry Bureau (later renamed Sichuan Provincial Machinery Industry Department) in 1975, and was elevated to director in 1986. In 1988, he was appointed director of Sichuan Provincial Planned Economy Commission, but having held the position for only two years. 

In 1990, he became vice minister of Machinery Industry, rising to minister in March 1996. In 1998, he became deputy head of the National Development and Reform Commission, a post he kept until 1999. 

He was appointed deputy party secretary of Chongqing in June 1999, concurrently holding the mayor position.

References

1939 births
Living people
People from Wuxi
Central Party School of the Chinese Communist Party
People's Republic of China politicians from Jiangsu
Chinese Communist Party politicians from Jiangsu
Mayors of Chongqing
Members of the 15th Central Committee of the Chinese Communist Party
Members of the Standing Committee of the 10th Chinese People's Political Consultative Conference